Reem Kaseem (born 1 October 1995) is an Egyptian swimmer. She competed in the women's marathon 10 kilometre event at the 2016 Summer Olympics.

Major results

Individual

Long course

Open water swimming

References

External links
 

1995 births
Living people
Egyptian female swimmers
Female long-distance swimmers
Olympic swimmers of Egypt
Swimmers at the 2016 Summer Olympics
Swimmers at the 2013 Mediterranean Games
Swimmers at the 2015 African Games
Place of birth missing (living people)
African Games competitors for Egypt
Mediterranean Games competitors for Egypt
Islamic Solidarity Games medalists in swimming
Islamic Solidarity Games competitors for Egypt
20th-century Egyptian women
21st-century Egyptian women